Rhys Williams (born August 9, 1995) is an American soccer player who currently plays for Detroit City FC in the USL Championship.

Career

College and PDL
Williams played college soccer at Columbia University between 2013 and 2016.

While at college, Williams appeared for New York Red Bulls U-23 in both the National Premier Soccer League and the Premier Development League.

Professional
Following college in April 2017, Williams signed a professional contract with National Premier Soccer League side New York Cosmos B.

On February 15, 2018, Williams signed with United Soccer League side Real Monarchs.

On January 14, 2019, Williams joined USL League One side Lansing Ignite ahead of their inaugural 2019 season.

Williams signed with South Georgia Tormenta of USL League One on January 14, 2020.

In April 2021, Williams joined National Independent Soccer Association side Stumptown AC ahead of the spring 2021 season.

In January 2022, Williams joined USL Championship side Detroit City FC ahead of the 2022 season.

References

External links
 
 Columbia Lions profile
 Real Monarchs profile

1995 births
Living people
American soccer players
Association football defenders
Association football midfielders
Columbia Lions men's soccer players
Lansing Ignite FC players
New York Red Bulls U-23 players
People from Weston, Florida
Real Monarchs players
Soccer players from Florida
Sportspeople from Broward County, Florida
USL Championship players
USL League Two players
USL League One players
Tormenta FC players